Year of the Cat may refer to:

 Cat (zodiac) - Vietnamese zodiac sign
 Year of the Cat (album) – 1976 Al Stewart album
 Year of the Cat (song) – 1976 Al Stewart single and title track of the album